J.R. Perret was the head of Elswick Ordnance Company in the early twentieth century. His warship designs included the Brazilian s and Rio de Janeiro (later ), and the Chilean s.

References 

British naval architects
Year of birth missing
Year of death missing